Balabusta is a Yiddish expression describing a good homemaker. The transliteration according to YIVO Standard orthography is baleboste. The term ultimately became more popular than the original Hebrew expression for a (female) home owner,  . (As used in Modern Hebrew,   means "landlord".)

Variants in pronunciation (balabusta and ) are due to the phonologies of different Yiddish dialects, where the pronunciation of אָ (komets alef) as /ɔ/ becomes /ʊ/ in some regions.

Connotations
The term historically has the positive connotation of an extremely competent and self-assured homemaker, though for some, the term has come to represent the feeling of being "chained to the stove" and denied opportunities outside the home. The traditional role of the baleboste is essentially that of the wife in Judaism; that is, she must manage the home in both practical terms - housekeeping duties such as cooking, cleaning, and maintaining the household finances - and spiritual ones, as in facilitating shalom bayit, the Jewish religious concept of general domestic harmony, and good relations between husband and wife.

Due in part to the coincidental similarity of the word to the English colloquialism "ballbuster", defined as "a person who is relentlessly aggressive, intimidating, or domineering", baleboste as used by English-speakers has taken on the connotation of assertiveness or bossiness.

In popular culture
 
An Ashkenazi folk song, "Baleboste Zisinke" ("sweet homemaker"), was first recorded by Yo'el Engel, an ethnomusicologist, critic, and composer. Engel joined fellow Jewish anthropologist and writer An-Ski on his ethnographic expedition to the Pale of Settlement, where he first heard and recorded the song.

The song was later reinterpreted by musician Socalled, who sampled a version of it for the song "Baleboste" on his 2007 album Ghettoblaster. The track also features a sample from the midcentury Jewish-American comedian Belle Barth: "She says dirty words in a cute way and everybody digs her the most . . . 'cause she's a baleboste, she makes flanken [short ribs] with kasha varnishkes."

Martin Davidson's Rechnitzer Rejects group recorded a song titled "Balabustas", an homage to the traditional role set to the theme song of the 1984 movie Ghostbusters.

See also
 Homemaker
 Jewish views of marriage
 List of English words of Yiddish origin
 Rebbetzin
 Role of women in Judaism
 Tzniut

References

Ashkenazi Jews topics
Judaism and women
Yiddish words and phrases